Mr. Happiness is a 2017 Italian comedy film directed by Alessandro Siani and starring Siani, Diego Abatantuono and Carla Signoris. It was released in Italy by 01 Distribution on 1 January 2017.

Plot
Martino is a lazy young Neapolitan who lives in Switzerland at his sister's place. When she suffers an accident, he has to replace her in at work as a cleaning lady.

Martino cleans the office of a psychologist and mental coach and one day, when the doctor is absent, he decides to try to replace him, assuming the name "Mr. Happiness". So Martino meets a doctor's patient, Caterina (a high level ice skater facing a performance drop) and falls in love with her, even though she has relationship problems with her strict mother.

Cast
Alessandro Siani as Martino
Diego Abatantuono as Guglielmo Gioia
Carla Signoris as Augusta

Reception

References

External links

Films directed by Alessandro Siani
Italian comedy films
2017 comedy films
2010s Italian films